Kjosfossen Station is a railway station in Aurland, Norway, on the Flåm Line. The station opened in 1951 as Kjosfossen kraftstasjon, but took the current name from February 1977. There are no residents in the area and the station only exists to allow tourists to step off the train and see the large waterfall Kjosfossen - which can be viewed from the station's platform. It is also the site of Kjosfoss Power Station.

References

Bibliography

Notes

Railway stations on the Flåm Line
Railway stations in Aurland
Railway stations opened in 1951
1951 establishments in Norway